National State Bank may refer to:

National State Bank (Mount Pleasant, Iowa), listed on the National Register of Historic Places in Henry County, Iowa
National State Bank (Camden, New Jersey), listed on the National Register of Historic Places in Camden County, New Jersey